This is the map and list of American countries by monthly net (after taxes) average wage. The chart below reflects the average (mean) wage as reported by various data providers. The salary distribution is right-skewed,  therefore more than 50% of people earn less than the average net salary. These figures have been shrunk after the application of the income tax. In certain countries, actual incomes may exceed those listed in the table due to the existence of grey economies. In some countries, social security, contributions for pensions, public schools, and health are included in these taxes.

USA's net wage is calculated without state's taxes

See also
List of countries by average wage
List of European countries by average wage
List of Asian countries by average wage
List of countries by GDP (nominal) per capita
List of countries by GDP (PPP) per capita
List of countries by GDP (nominal)
List of countries by GDP (PPP)

References

Average wage
Average wage
 Countries
Lists of salaries